Ercaicunia is genus of bivalved Cambrian arthropod from the Chengjiang biota of Yunnan, China. It contains a single species, E. multinodosa that was described by Luo et al. in 1999. The bivalved carapace covered about a third of the total body-length, and has up to six serrations on its forward edge. The head has a pair of large uniramous antennae, as well as a smaller pair of secondary antennae, as well as pair of mandibles and maxillae. The trunk has 16 pairs of biramous appendages. Specimens were CT scanned in 2019, which suggested it to be a stem-group crustacean. Other subsequent studies have recovered it as a member of Hymenocarina, which contains other bivalved Cambrian arthropods.

See also

 Arthropod
 Cambrian explosion
 Chengjiang biota
 List of Chengjiang Biota species by phylum

References

Fossil taxa described in 1999
Cambrian animals
Maotianshan shales fossils
Prehistoric arthropod genera
Pancrustacea

Cambrian genus extinctions
Hymenocarina